Sabine Thalbach (actually Sabine Joachim genannt Thalbach; 4 August 1932 – 30 September 1966) was a German actress who appeared in many East German films. She was married to the director Benno Besson, and was the mother of the actress Katharina Thalbach.

Selected filmography
 The Kaiser's Lackey (1951)
 Don't Forget My Little Traudel (1957)

References

External links 
 

1932 births
1966 deaths
Actresses from Berlin
German film actresses
20th-century German actresses